Naiba Dam (内場ダム, Naiba damu) is a dam in Kagawa Prefecture, Japan, completed in 1952. The dam is 50 m high, and was built primarily for flood control and water supply maintenance.

References 

Dams in Kagawa Prefecture
Dams completed in 1952